Jose Dan Slaughter (born September 9, 1960) is an American former basketball player. He was a 6'5"  shooting guard and attended the University of Portland.

Slaughter played for the NBA's Indiana Pacers during the 1982-83 season, averaging 5.7 points and 1.9 rebounds per game. He was originally selected by the Spurs with the 20th pick in the second round (43rd overall) of the 1982 NBA Draft.

Notes

External links
NBA stats @ basketballreference.com

1960 births
Living people
Alaska Aces (PBA) players
Albany Patroons players
American expatriate basketball people in Canada
American expatriate basketball people in the Philippines
American men's basketball players
Basketball players from Los Angeles
Compton High School alumni
Indiana Pacers draft picks
Indiana Pacers players
Philippine Basketball Association imports
Portland Pilots men's basketball players
Quad City Thunder players
Rochester Flyers players
Shooting guards
Basketball players from Compton, California
TNT Tropang Giga players
Wisconsin Flyers players
Yakima Sun Kings players